Splinter pattern camouflage is a military camouflage pattern consisting of polygons.

Splittermuster (German for splinter-pattern) was developed by Germany in the late 1920s.  Splittermuster was issued to practically all Wehrmacht units. The pattern consists of a disruptive pattern of hard-edged polygons, with sharp corners between coloured patches. A random pattern of dashes was applied in places to improve the camouflage effect.

M90 camouflage is the camouflage pattern used by the Swedish armed forces for clothing and vehicles. The pattern employs hard lines of geometric shapes in order to create a camouflage pattern effective in the temperate forests and plains of Sweden. M90 camouflage comprises four colours: dark green, medium green, dark navy and light beige.  Desert and jungle variants have also been developed.

References

Camouflage patterns